The 1994 Volvo PGA Championship was the 40th edition of the Volvo PGA Championship, an annual professional golf tournament on the European Tour. It was held 27–30 May at the West Course of Wentworth Club in Virginia Water, Surrey, England, a suburb southwest of London.

José María Olazábal won his first Volvo PGA Championship with a one stroke victory over Ernie Els.

Round summaries

First round 
Thursday, 27 May 1994

Second round 
Friday, 28 May 1994

Third round 
Saturday, 29 May 1994

Final round 
Sunday, 30 May 1994

References 

BMW PGA Championship
Golf tournaments in England
Volvo PGA Championship
Volvo PGA Championship
Volvo PGA Championship